The 2006 Michigan Attorney General election took place on November 7, 2006, to elect the Attorney General of Michigan. Incumbent Mike Cox became the first Republican in over 50 years to be elected attorney general and was seeking to become the first Republican since the amending of the Michigan Constitution to be re-elected. Despite a 2005 scandal where Cox announced he had an extramarital affair before becoming Attorney General Cox won re-election easily, defeating Democratic nominee Amos Williams, taking 54 percent of the vote.

Republican Party

Candidates

 Mike Cox, Michigan Attorney General

Democratic Party

Candidates

 Amos Williams

Minor parties

Libertarian Party
 Bill Hall

U.S. Taxpayers Party
 Charles F. Conces

General election

Results

References

See also

Attorney General
Michigan Attorney General elections
November 2006 events in the United States
Michigan